Chaithra J Achar, also known as Chaithra Achar, is an Indian actress and singer of Kannada cinema. She was born and raised in Bangalore, she made her acting debut in the Kannada film Mahira (2019) and she also began her career as a playback Vocalist. 
One of her recent songs "Sojugaada Sooju Mallige" composed by Midhun Mukundan, for Raj. B. Shetty’s Garuda Gamana Vrishabha Vahana became a sleeper hit and was chartbuster song of 2021.

Early life

Chaithra Achar was born on 4 March 1995 in Bangalore, Karnataka. She grew up listening to music at home while her mother sang, she eventually acquired an interest in singing and went on to study Carnatic classical music. Since childhood she has been a part of many theatre productions. She participated in various competitions and received multiple awards.
Chaithra comes from a family that values education and arts, she studied in Parikrama Humanity Foundation, where her father used to be a teacher. Later, she went to M.S. Ramaiah Institute of Technology in Bangalore to study engineering and also worked as an intern at JNCASR.

Career

Acting
Chaithra, while still in college, began her professional acting career with Bengaluru Queens, a Kannada Web Series directed and produced by actor Anish Tejeshwar.
She made her Kannada feature film debut in 2019, with the action thriller Mahira, directed by Mahesh Gowda.  Chaithra is well-known for her lead roles in films with astounding performances such as "Gilky", "Taledanda", and AaDrushya.

Chaithra has a variety of projects lined-up namely Rakshit Shetty studio’s "Strawberry", Srinidhi Bengaluru‘s "Blink", Rakesh Kadri’s "Happy Birthday To Me", Shiva Ganeshan’s "Yaarigu Helbedi" and other two untitled films, which are ready for release. She is currently filming for Sapta Sagaradaache Yello starring Rakshit Shetty and Rukmini vasanth, directed by Hemanth M Rao.

Singing

Chaithra has always enjoyed music and singing. In truth, she had intended to be a professional singer, and acting came about by chance. She started as chorus singer in many feature films in 2019-20, eventually ventured into playback singing. Later on, she became one of the popular vocalists in the cinema industry. Chaithra’s latest hit number is "Sojugaada Sooju Mallige" is talk of the town, composed by musician Midhun Mukundan from Garuda Gamana Vrishabha Vahana, chartbuster album of 2021.

Filmography

Film

Singing

Awards and nominations

References

External links 
 

1995 births
Living people
Indian film actresses
Actresses in Kannada cinema
Actresses from Bangalore
21st-century Indian actresses
Kannada actresses